The middleweight division in mixed martial arts refers to different weight classes:

The UFC's middleweight division, which groups competitors within 171 to 185 lb (77.5 to 84 kg)
The Shooto's middleweight class, which refers to competitors between 155 and 170 lb (70.3 and 77.1 kg)
The ONE Championship's middleweight division follows the Pride FC model, with an upper limit of 
The Road FC's  middleweight division, with an upper limit of 185 lb (84 kg)

Ambiguity and clarification
For the sake of uniformity, many mixed martial arts websites refer to competitors between 171 and 185 lb (77.5 and 84 kg) as middleweights. This encompasses Shooto's light heavyweight division of the same weight limit.

The middleweight limit, as defined by the Nevada State Athletic Commission and the Association of Boxing Commissions is 185 lb (84 kg).

Professional champions

Current champions
Table accurate as of March 2023. 
 Active title reign

See also
List of current MMA Middleweight champions
List of UFC Middleweight Champions
List of Strikeforce Middleweight Champions
List of Pancrase Middleweight Champions
List of Road FC Middleweight Champions

Footnotes and references

Mixed martial arts weight classes